The following is a list of UCLA Bruins softball seasons. The University of California, Los Angeles is a member of the Pac-12 Conference of the NCAA Division I.  The Bruins are fourteen time Women's College World Series champions, with the first of those titles coming during the AIAW years, and the remaining 13 under NCAA organization.  UCLA has also appeared in the final event 33 times - 3 under the AIAW and 30 under the NCAA.  The team played its first season in 1975.

Notes

References

UCLA
UCLA Bruins softball